Bruneau jasper is a variety of the mineral jasper.  It is a  "picture jasper" – a jasper that exhibits particular patterns and colors – and is used as an opaque gemstone.

The stone exhibits layered patterns of brown, reddish brown and cream color, or sometimes of red and green color.

As of 2009 Bruneau jasper was no longer in production, and was difficult to locate.

References

Jasper
Geology of Idaho